Hygrocybe singeri or witch's hat is a species of Hygrocybe from Northwestern California. Hygrocybe singeri stains black when bruised.

The species is very similar to Hygrocybe conica, differing in its viscid stipe.

References

External links
 
 

singeri
Fungi of California